Aristotelia is a genus with 18 species, of tree in the family Elaeocarpaceae. It is named in honor of the Greek philosopher, observer and classifier of nature, Aristotle.

Species
Aristotelia australasica
Aristotelia braithwaitei
Aristotelia chilensis
Aristotelia colensoi
Aristotelia erecta
Aristotelia fruticosa
Aristotelia peduncularis
Aristotelia serrata

References

 
Elaeocarpaceae genera